6 News may refer to:

News channels
 6 News Lawrence, in Lawrence, Kansas

News departments
These television stations use the name "6 News" for their news programming:

 KFDM, in Beaumont, Texas
 KRIS-TV, in Corpus Christi, Texas
 WATE-TV, in Knoxville, Tennessee
 WLNS-TV, in Lansing, Michigan
 WRTV, in Indianapolis, Indiana